George Augustus "Mickey" Murtagh (April 8, 1904 – February 10, 1993) was a professional American football player who played offensive lineman for seven seasons for the New York Giants.

References

External links

1904 births
1993 deaths
American football offensive linemen
Georgetown Hoyas baseball coaches
Georgetown Hoyas football coaches
Georgetown Hoyas football players
New York Giants players
Sportspeople from Jersey City, New Jersey
Players of American football from Jersey City, New Jersey
St. Peter's Preparatory School alumni